Denver City is a city located in Gaines County and Yoakum County in the far western portion of the U.S. state of Texas, just a short distance from the New Mexico boundary. It is named for the petroleum company Denver Productions. The population was 4,479 at the 2010 census. The city is located at the intersection of Texas State Highways 214 and 83.

In 2008, the Denver City Independent School District presented a bond package for new and renovated facilities. Upgrades included a new high school, tennis courts, a junior-high band hall, an industrial arts facility, a sports complex, a maintenance center, an athletics field house, and a bus barn. Renovations included classrooms, science labs, offices and foyer, a parking lot, a  main field house, and a bus barn for the junior-high campus.

On May 11, 2013, voters in both Denver City and Yoakum County, as well as Crosby County, also in West Texas, all previously under local-option prohibition laws, approved the sale of liquor.

Geography
Denver City is located at  (32.968580, −102.831218).

According to the United States Census Bureau, Denver City has a total area of 2.5 square miles (6.5 km2), all land.

Demographics

2020 census

As of the 2020 United States census, there were 4,470 people, 1,516 households, and 1,012 families residing in the town.

2010 census
As of the census of 2010,  4,479 people,  1,770 households, and 1,578 families resided in the town. The racial makeup of the town was 31.2% White, 1.3% African American, 1% Native American, 0.6% Asian, 63.3% Hispanic or Latino, 0.1 Cuban, and 2.5% from two or more races. Of the 1,770 households, 27.5% had children under the age of 18 living with them, 63.8% were married couples living together, 10.5% had a female householder with no husband present, and 20.4% were not families. About 22.6% had someone living alone who was 65 years of age or older. The average household size was 2.96 and the average family size was 3.27.

In the town, the population was distributed as 34% up to age  19, 5.8% from 20 to 24, 25.7% from 25 to 44, 23.1% from 45 to 64, and 11.5% who were 65 years of age or older. The median age was 32.2 years of age.

According to a 2017 survey, the median income for a household in the town was $52,232, and for a family was $67,630. Males had a median income of $65,495 versus $23,346 for females. The per capita income for the town was $21,297. About 15.8% of families and 16.1% of the population were below the poverty line, including 19% of those under age 18 and 35% of those age 65 or over.

Climate

Notable people
 Chip Bennett, former NFL player with the Cincinnati Bengals

References

External links

 Handbook of Texas Online: Denver City, Texas
 KCBD TV, Lubbock
 Denver City Economic Development Corporation

Towns in Gaines County, Texas
Towns in Yoakum County, Texas
Towns in Texas